Dekwaneh ( translit. Dikwene) (also Dekweneh)  is a suburb north of Beirut in the Matn District of the Mount Lebanon Governorate, Lebanon. The population is predominantly Maronite Christian. Tel al-Zaatar, an UNRWA administered Palestinian refugee camp housing approximately 50,000-60,000 refugees, and the site of the Tel al-Zaatar massacre were located on the outskirts of the town.

Archaeology
Material was found by Raoul Describes, who mentioned rock-shelters in the area that were destroyed by quarrying for quicklime. Further collections were found by Auguste Bergy and Peter Wescombe. Some of the flint tools recovered were determined to be Acheulean as well as a large amount of waste and bifaces from the Middle Paleolithic that suggested it was a factory site at that time.

Dekwaneh II material comes from various locations around the area, most notably the ravine below the monastery. Flint tools were also found here by Bergy and Describes which included the Qaraoun culture's Heavy Neolithic forms such as massive axes, picks, scrapers and rabots. Other early Neolithic tools were found along with some Middle Paleolithic material including an Emireh point and tortoise cores. Along with material from Dekwaneh I, finds from the locations are stored in the Museum of Lebanese Prehistory.

LGBT rights
Dekwaneh gained notoriety in the press and social media when, on Monday 22 April 2013, the mayor, Antoine Chakhtoura, ordered Lebanese security forces to raid and shut down a gay-friendly nightclub called Ghost.  A number of Syrian gay men and a Lebanese transgender woman were arrested during the raid and taken to municipal headquarters where it is reported that they were harassed and forced to undress. According to reports, the transgender woman was also photographed naked.

Image gallery

Airfield

Remains of a former airfield can be found in Tal El Zaatar. Only a small section of runway exist with Northern section along Mar Roukoz has been reused for commercial warehouses.

References

External links
Dekwaneh - Deir Mar Roukoz - Dahr El Hossein, Localiban 

Populated places in the Matn District
Maronite Christian communities in Lebanon

Archaeological sites in Lebanon
Paleolithic
Heavy Neolithic sites